This a listing of motorcycles of the 1930s, including those on sale, introduced, or otherwise relevant in this period.

Motorcycle

Abendsonne
Acme motorcycle (1939–1949)
AJS Model E (1925-1939)
AJS S3 V-twin
AJS Silver Streak
AJS V4
Ariel Red Hunter
Ariel Square Four
BMW R12
BMW R2
BMW WR 750 (Introduced 1929 on sale in 1930s)
BMW Type 255 (produced 1935–1939)
Brough Superior Austin Four
Brough Superior Golden Dream
BSA B21
BSA Blue Star
BSA C11
BSA Empire Star
BSA Gold Star
BSA M20
BSA M33-10
BSA W33-7
DKW RT 125
DKW SS 350
Excelsior Manxman
Harley-Davidson RL 45
Matchless G3/L
Matchless Silver Hawk
New Imperial Model 76
Norton 16H 
OEC
PMZ-A-750
Royal Enfield Bullet
Royal Enfield WD/RE
Scott Model 3S
Scott Flying Squirrel (1926-1939)
Sokół 1000
Triumph 6/1 (1933-1935)
Type 97 motorcycle
Vincent Comet
Vincent Rapide
Vincent Meteor
Wolf Cub
Wolf Minor
Wolf Utility
Wolf Vixen
Wolf Supersports
Wolf Unit

Tricycle
Harley-Davidson Servi-Car
Indian Dispatch-Tow

Gallery

See also

Cyclecars
Ford Model T
Horse and buggy
List of motorcycles by type of engine
List of motorcycles of the 1890s
List of motorcycles of 1900 to 1909
List of motorcycles of the 1910s
List of motorcycles of the 1920s
List of motorcycles of the 1940s
List of motorcycles of the 1950s
List of motorcycle manufacturers
List of motorized trikes
Safety bicycle

References

Lists of motorcycles
Motorcycles introduced in the 1930s